Merengue is a Japanese rock band licensed by Warner Music Japan. The band was created in 2002 by Kenji Kubo . In 2003, Takeshi Yamazaki and Tsuyoshi Takeshita joined the band . In 2013, they signed to Ki/oon Music and performed the Sixth Opening of Space Brothers.

Members
Kenji Kubo (クボケンジ Kubo Kenji) is in charge of vocals, guitar, and the synthesizer.
Takeshi Yamazaki (ヤマザキタケシ Yamazaki Takeshi) is the drummer.
Tsuyoshi Takeshita (タケシタツヨシ Takeshita Tsuyoshi) is the bassist.

External links
Official Website

Japanese rock music groups
Ki/oon Music artists